The Chemical and Biological Defense Division (CBD) is a division of the Science and Technology Directorate of the United States Department of Homeland Security. Within the Homeland Security Advanced Research Projects Agency, CBD develops technologies to increase the United States's preparedness and protect key national infrastructure against chemical, biological, and agricultural threats and disasters through improved threat awareness and advanced surveillance, detection, and protective countermeasures.

Overview
The 2007 High Priority Technical Needs brochure published by Homeland Security defines critical focus areas for chemical and biological research, falling primarily under the category of "chemical/biological weapons defense":

 Tools to detect and mitigate animal disease breakouts
 Policy net assessments to provide fresh perspectives on fundamental elements of the national biodefense strategy
 Improved tools for integrated CBRN Risk Assessment
 Incident characterization capability for response & restoration
 Improved ChemBio Forensic Analysis capability
 National-scale detection architectures and strategies to address outdoor, indoor (e.g., highly trafficked transportation hubs) and critical infrastructure
 Consequence assessments of attacks on chemical facilities and Chem Bio attacks on other critical infrastructure
 Integrated CBRNE Sensor Reporting capability
 Handheld rapid biological and chemical detection systems
 Detection paradigms and systems for enhanced, emerging and novel biological threats

See also

 Chemical Facility Anti-Terrorism Standards

References

External links
 Directorate for Science and Technology Chemical and Biological Division

Water transportation in the United States
Border and Maritime Security Division